Elaphe anomala commonly known as the Korean rat snake is a non-venomous species of colubrid snake known from China and Korea. Its common names include Amur ratsnake, southern Amur ratsnake, and faded Russian ratsnake. It is a semi-arboreal snake that can be found in grasslands, dry scrub, rocky areas, and on the banks of rivers and lakes.

References 

Elaphe
Reptiles of China
Reptiles of Korea
Reptiles described in 1916